Xulio Villarino is a Spanish photographer born on the 21st of July, 1969 who lives in Porto de Bares, Mañón.

Villarino was born in Fazouro, Foz and began teaching himself the photographic techniques when he was 16 years old. He started working for the Spanish newspaper La Voz de Galicia in 1993, even though he has contributed to other publications, including El Semanal.

He has won numerous prizes, including:
 Luis Ksado, 1998
 Fuij Europress Photo Awards, 1999, Spanish Phase
 Ortega y Gasset, 2000
 Fuji, 2002 in the Travels category, 2003 in the News category

And has been shortlisted for:
Injuve, 1999
Luis Valtuena, 2000, 2001

External links
 Villarino's official website and biography
The main page of the above website contains full frontal nudity of pre-adolescent boys, with other sections containing further images of nudes
 Official La Voz de Galicia website in Spanish

1969 births
Living people
Spanish photographers